SPL II: A Time for Consequences (also known as Sha po lang 2 or Kill Zone 2) is a 2015 Hong Kong-Chinese martial arts action film directed by Cheang Pou-soi and produced by Wilson Yip and Paco Wong. The film starred Tony Jaa, Wu Jing, Simon Yam and Zhang Jin, with Louis Koo making a special appearance. The film was released on 18 June 2015 in both 3D and non-3D formats.

According to Twitchfilm, SPL II is a sequel "in-name-only" to the 2005 film SPL: Sha Po Lang, which was directed by Wilson Yip and starred Donnie Yen, Sammo Hung and Simon Yam. SPL II featured a completely new storyline, with Wu Jing and Simon Yam from the first film returning as new characters, and introducing new cast members Louis Koo, Tony Jaa and Zhang Jin; Donnie Yen and Sammo Hung did not participate in the second film.

The film was later followed by a thematic sequel, titled Paradox, released in 2017, directed by Yip, with Koo and Jaa returning as new characters.

Plot
Kit is a Hong Kong undercover cop who becomes a drug addict to infiltrate a crime syndicate which has been kidnapping people and sending them to Thailand, where the victims are killed and have their organs sold in the black market. The mastermind behind the syndicate, Mr Hung, has a rare heart condition and needs to undergo a heart transplant to prolong his life. Hung's younger brother is the ideal donor for a heart.

When Hung sends his men to kidnap his brother, the situation goes haywire and a gunfight breaks out because the police have been tipped off by Kit about the kidnappers' plan. Hung's brother is injured during the shootout but is rescued by the police. Kit, on the other hand, escapes with the kidnappers but his cover is blown. Hung's men kill Kit's friend and knock Kit himself unconscious and sends him to a prison in Thailand. The chief warden, Ko Chun, works for Hung and has been keeping the kidnapped victims alive in the prison before they are killed for their organs. Kit is made to serve a life sentence in the prison.

While in prison, Kit attempts to escape twice and fights with the prison guard Chatchai but ends up being subdued every time. Chatchai's daughter has leukaemia and needs to undergo a bone marrow transplant to survive. Chatchai witnesses Ko Chun's illegal activities and brutality but forces himself to remain quiet because he does not want to lose his job. The donor who agreed to donate bone marrow to Chatchai's daughter is Kit.

Back in Hong Kong, Hung reveals himself to Kit's uncle and supervisor, Wah, who is keeping a close watch on Hung's brother in hospital. Hung threatens Wah to hand over his brother to him in exchange for Kit. Although Wah initially agrees, he changes his mind later and hides Hung's brother in his friend's house. He then leaves his subordinates behind to guard Hung's brother while he tracks down Kit's location in Thailand and travels there. An angry Hung then sends his right-hand man Ah-Zai, a dangerous knife-wielding assassin to follow Wah's subordinates and kill them and take Hung's brother hostage. Ah-Zai easily murders every cop he spots and snaps a picture of Hung's brother to Hung.

In Thailand, Wah bribes Kwong, Chatchai's colleague, and enters the prison to find Kit. Shortly after Kit and Wah are reunited, they are discovered by Ko Chun, who captures them and orders Chatchai and Kwong to escort them to the hideout where victims are killed and have their organs removed. At the hideout, Kit and Wah break free from captivity and fight their way out. On the other hand, Chatchai and Kwong change their minds and turn back to help Kit and Wah. Kit, Wah and Kwong manage to escape despite sustaining very serious injuries during the fight; Chatchai is captured by Ko Chun's men, who tie him up and torture him.

Meanwhile Hung's brother is brought to a medical centre in Thailand for the heart operation. However, Kit breaks into the medical centre, defeats Ah-zai in a fight by breaking his limbs, and takes Hung hostage. He then demands that Ko Chun bring Chatchai to him in exchange for Hung. A fight breaks out when Ko Chun and his men show up with Chatchai. Kit and Chatchai team up and defeat all of Ko Chun's men. At the same time, Hung breaks free from his restraints and attacks his brother, but his medical condition deteriorates and he becomes blind as a consequence. He dies as he tells his brother not to fear himself.

Kit and Chatchai are seemingly no match for Ko Chun after engaging him in a long fight. At one point, Chatchai is knocked out after being stabbed by Ko Chun, who then proceeds to pound Kit against the window until the glass shatters. While in his unconscious state, Chatchai has a vision of his daughter in danger and immediately gets up and knocks Ko Chun out of the window. However, when he realises Kit has also fallen out of the window, he throws out a chain for Kit to hold on to, but Ko Chun grabs the chain instead. Kit then grabs on to Ko Chun's tie and eventually strangles him to death while dangling from his tie. Chatchai stretches out his hand and pulls Kit back to safety. The movie ends with Sa now growing up narrates that she got the transplant and remembers Chatchai hugging his daughter while Kit watches from a distance away.

Cast
 Tony Jaa as Chatchai Tak (阿猜德) "Tak" (德), a Thai prison guard.
 Wu Jing as Chan Chi-kit (陳志杰) "Kit" (杰), a Hong Kong undercover cop.
 Simon Yam as Chan Kwok-wah (陳國華) "Wah" (華), Kit's uncle and supervisor.
 Zhang Jin as Ko Chun (高晉), the chief warden of the Thai prison who works for Mr Hung.
 Louis Koo (special appearance) as Hung Man-kong (洪文剛) or Mr Hung (洪爺), the boss of the crime syndicate.
 Andrew Ng as Uncle On, assistant to Mr. Hung
 Ken Lo as Wong Kwong (黃光) or Kwong (光), Chatchai's colleague.
 Jun Kung as Hung Man-biu (洪文彪), Mr Hung's younger brother.
 Dominic Lam as Cheung Chun-tung (張振東), Wah's superior in the police force.
 Babyjohn Choi as Kwok Chun-yat (郭俊一), Wah's subordinate.
 Wilson Tsui as Dai-hau (大口), Wah's subordinate.
 Unda Kunteera Yhordchanng as Sa (莎), Chatchai's daughter.
 Candy Yuen as Fong Wing-kum (方詠琴), Hung Mun-biu's wife.
 Philip Keung as Fan Ging-hung (范勁雄), the boss of a smuggling ring.
 Eddie Pang as Hung's henchman
 Zhang Chi as Ah-zai (亞囝), Hung's knife-wielding henchman.

Production
With a budget of US$23 million, filming started on 1 May 2014 and concluded on 6 September 2014.

Release
The first trailer was released on 23 March 2015. The film was released in Hong Kong and China on June 18, 2015.

Reception

Box office
The film grossed an estimated US$43.36 million in its four-day opening weekend, debuting at No. 2 at the Chinese box office behind Jurassic World and third place worldwide behind Jurassic World and Inside Out.

Critical reception
On Review aggregator Rotten Tomatoes the website gives the film a score of 100% based on 23 reviews, with an average rating of 7.17/10. Metacritic, which uses a weighted average gives the film a score of 73/100 based on 9 reviews, indicating "generally favorable reviews."

On The Hollywood Reporter, Elizabeth Kerr called the film "a tight, entertaining action flick". Joe Leydon of Variety called it "a martial-arts noir melodrama that neatly entwines operatic outbursts of emotion with bodacious bouts of butt kicking." Derek Elley of Film Business Asia gave the film a score of 6/10 and called it "a big, splashy mess, with a chaotic script."

Sequel
The third film in the SPL series, Paradox, was released in China and Hong Kong on 17 August 2017 and 25 August 2017, respectively. The film featured Wilson Yip returning to the director's chair while Cheang Pou-soi served as producer and stars Louis Koo, Tony Jaa and Ken Lo returning in different roles alongside new cast members Gordon Lam, Wu Yue and Chris Collins. Sammo Hung, who appeared in SPL: Sha Po Lang, served as the action director for Paradox.

References

External links
 

2015 films
2015 3D films
2015 action thriller films
2010s mystery films
2010s Cantonese-language films
Chinese 3D films
Chinese action thriller films
Chinese martial arts films
Films directed by Cheang Pou-soi
Hong Kong 3D films
Hong Kong action thriller films
Hong Kong martial arts films
Chinese detective films
Hong Kong detective films
Police detective films
Films set in Hong Kong
Films shot in Hong Kong
SPL films
Films set in Thailand
Films shot in Thailand
2015 martial arts films
2010s Mandarin-language films
2010s Hong Kong films
2015 multilingual films